David Daube  (8 February 1909, in Freiburg, Germany – 24 February 1999, in Berkeley, California) was the twentieth century's preeminent scholar of ancient law. He combined a familiarity with many legal systems, particularly Roman law and biblical law, with an expertise in Greek, Roman, Jewish, and Christian literature, and used literary, religious, and legal texts to illuminate each other and, among other things, to "transform the position of Roman law" and to launch a "revolution" or "near revolution" in New Testament studies.

Life
He was the son of Jacob Daube, of Freiburg (whose family probably migrated generations earlier from France), and Selma Ascher of Nördlingen, whose family descends directly from Rabbi Meir of Rothenburg, the Maharam. Daube married in 1936 and divorced in 1964; he had three sons. (Daube's eldest son, Jonathan, has the middle name, "Maharam.") Daube was an in-law of Leo Strauss (one of Selma Ascher's siblings married into the Strauss family of Amöneburg-Kirchhain-Marburg). Daube was critical in getting Strauss out of Nazi Germany by helping to find him a position at the University of Cambridge in 1935. Daube fled Germany for England earlier, in 1933, but made several trips back to Europe to help bring out family members, friends, and mere acquaintances, with the assistance of Cambridge professors, fellows, and students, but especially the then-graduate student Philip Grierson.

In 1970, at the height of his career, he left his fellowship at All Souls College and his chair, Regius Professor of Civil Law (Oxford), and moved to California, where he became Professor-in-Residence at UC Berkeley's law school, then known as Boalt Hall, where he taught for the rest of his life. He married again in 1986.

Daube's teachers include Otto Lenel, who "encouraged" him to take up the study of legal history in the first place, according to Daube's notes in his first published book, Studies in Biblical Law. Daube goes on to thank Professors Johannes Hempel and Wolfgang Kunkel of Göttingen, who trained Daube in rigorous scholarly methods. The influence of C.H. Dodd, whom Daube first met at Cambridge, guided Daube all his life; also at Cambridge, F.S. Marsh and Stanley A. Cook were important influences on Daube. And, finally, Professor William Warwick Buckland: "to him, in love," Daube dedicates his first book.

Studies in Biblical Law

The first chapter of Daube's first major book, Studies in Biblical Law, titled "Law in the Narratives," phrased in polite language, nonetheless starts with a revolutionary claim: all scholars since Henry Maine say that there is no separation of law and religion in "primitive," or ancient, legal systems. But, Daube notes, this is a generalization based upon the study of law in the Bible, and the Bible, after all, is "a collection of literature arranged by priests and prophets." They, naturally enough, he continues, "subordinated law to religion; indeed, they represented legal rules as religious rules, destined to guide God’s chosen people." But, he asks, "Is it safe to argue that because the devout authors of the Bible saw law as part of religion, law must have formed part of religion in the Hebrew state?" In answering this, he says, legal historians must go beyond the Bible, using the comparative method.

But, adds Daube, this application of the comparative method is not enough. Because "the Bible is an anthology compiled by priests and prophets, who were neither competent nor even desirous to formulate an accurate exposition of Hebrew law," one must first find out something about the true Hebrew law, separating it "from the dress in which priests and prophets have handed it down to us, like assembling a jigsaw puzzle from scattered fragments." The result of such an inquiry would likely show that the religious character of the law was not originally in it, but due to the theological tendencies of the authors of the Bible. Why, he concludes, should one assume the law sprang from religion rather than religion from the law? This question marks an important step: Biblical legal scholarship is not to be confined to pious exegesis of a text whose sacred character always makes its status primary.

Rather, Biblical law is a field of legal study, of rational inquiry, like any other field of legal study, and must be approached with the same analytical tools and methods. Moreover, this sacred text is not the authoritative statement of Hebrew law, for priestly transmission has distorted the law, the law that had an independent existence in the Israelite state. That law must be recovered from the Biblical narratives by careful juristic analysis.

Daube begins with examples of how that recovery ought to take place. He first looks at the narrative of Joseph and his brothers, showing how it can be understood in the context of principles of the law of custodianship, which provide the implicit legal categories utilized by the text and determine the contours of the action it recounts. And off he goes, inaugurating fifty years of path-breaking scholarship.

Work

Daube made seminal contributions to three fields—Biblical and Talmudic law; New Testament studies; and Roman law. Calum Carmichael, professor of comparative literature at Cornell and Daube's literary executor, describes his memoir of Daube—Ideas and the Man: Remembering David Daube—as "an attempt to convey the spirit of enlightenment that David Daube exuded in all his work and conversation. Outstanding law professor, classical scholar par excellence, ecumenical religious thinker, leading Talmudic scholar, skilled linguist, great humanist of the law, a brilliant literary critic, the foremost Roman lawyer of his day."

According to Carmichael, on account of Daube's knowledge of Aramaic and the Talmud, Daube was invited to attend the New Testament seminar run by C.H. Dodd at Cambridge. It aroused in him an absorbing interest in the rabbinic background to Christianity. New Testament studies was the area in which he was to make his most original contribution to scholarship, in his eyes also a contribution to Jewish–Christian relations, according to Tony Honoré. Daube reinterpreted many New Testament texts in the light of Talmudic scholarship. The Christian scriptures could be reappraised as a form of Jewish literature, which he called "New Testament Judaism."

W. D. Davies focused on this in his tribute to his teacher on his death: "It is the complexity in David that made him so magical. It is not surprising then that it was this most Jewish of scholars, who taught us that Christianity, is a New Testament Judaism—a strikingly pregnant phrase that he invented and which sums up best perhaps his legacy and the near revolution that he introduced into New Testament studies." In 1962-1964, Daube gave the Gifford Lectures on Natural Theology.

Students

In addition to Carmichael and the late W.D. Davies, Daube's students include the late C.K. Barrett, Durham (UK); Saul Berman, Yeshivat Chovevei Torah; Davi Ascher Strauss Bernstein, University of Chicago; David Cohen, UC-Berkeley; Martin Evans, Stanford; William Frankel; (A.M.) Tony Honoré, Regius Professor of Civil Law (Oxford); Bernard Jackson, Manchester and Liverpool; Lee Kuan Yew, longtime prime minister—and "father of"—Singapore; Fergus Millar, Oxford; John T. Noonan, Jr., UC-Berkeley/United States Court of Appeals for the Ninth Circuit; Stephen Passamaneck, Hebrew Union College-Jewish Institute of Religion; the late Lord Rodger (Alan Rodger, Baron Rodger of Earlsferry), Justice of the Supreme Court of the United Kingdom; E.P. Sanders, Duke; Peter Stein, Regius Professor of Civil Law (Cambridge); Géza Vermes, Oxford; Alan Watson, law faculties at the universities of Georgia, Edinburgh, and Belgrade; Reuven Yaron, Hebrew University of Jerusalem.

Pedagogy

Bernard Jackson testifies: "For two years, I submitted material on a weekly or fortnightly basis. As was his normal pattern with research students, [Daube] would invite me for lunch at All Souls, then spend most of the rest of the afternoon analysing and criticising my work line by line. No more intense or productive supervision could be imagined. I owe everything I may have done subsequently to this foundation. Alan Watson has recorded his enduring sense of fear of disappointing Daube in approaching these sessions. My own recollection is that of the feeling with which I always emerged. However devastating the criticism may have been - and never without justification - Daube always concluded with sincere and persuasive words of encouragement, which made me ready, even eager, to commence the next cycle of destruction.

"He was a warm, wise and generous mentor, whose support went far beyond doctoral supervision and subsequent academic advancement. He did not distance himself from the personal lives of his pupils, both in joy and sorrow. He spoke at [my wedding], but what stands out in my mind is not merely the studied flattery of his speech, but the manner in which he spoke informally to members of our respective families, without a hint of condescension but rather with genuine interest and human feeling."

Education 
 Berthold-Gymnasium, Freiburg
 Universities of Freiburg and Göttingen (Dr jur 1932)
 PhD University of Cambridge 1935

Career 
 1938-46 Fellow of Gonville and Caius College, Cambridge (Honorary fellow, 1974)
 1946-51 Lecturer in Law, University of Cambridge
 1951-55 Professor of Jurisprudence, University of Aberdeen
 1955-70 Regius Professor of Civil Law (Oxford), and Fellow of All Souls College, Oxford; Emeritus Fellow, 1980
 1970-99 Emeritus Professor of Law, Oxford
 1970-81 Professor-in-Residence and Director of the Robbins Hebraic and Roman Law Collections, Boalt Hall (School of Law), University of California, Berkeley
 1995-99 Emeritus Professor of Law, Berkeley

Other posts and honours 
 1953-1999 Member, Academic Board, Institute of Jewish Affairs
 1957 Fellow of the British Academy
 1957-8 President: Société d'Histoire des Droits de l'Antiquité
 1961 Founder-President, B'nai B'rith Oxford Lodge
 1964 Honorary D. Litt., University of Leicester
 1970 Honorary Member, Royal Irish Academy
 1971 DHL: Hebrew Union College
 1973 Honorary Fellow, Oxford Centre for Postgraduate Hebrew Studies
 1979 Fellow: American Academy for Jewish Research
 1983-5 President: Jewish Law Association

Publications

Books

 - based on his Messenger Lectures at Cornell)

Edited by

Chapters

Journal articles

Festschriften

 Daube Noster:  Essays in Legal History for David Daube, 1974 (ed. Alan Watson)
 Studies in Jewish Legal History: Essays in Honour of David Daube, 1974 (ed. Bernard Jackson)
 Donum Gentilicium: New Testament Studies in Honour of David Daube, 1978 (eds. Ernst Bammel, C.K. Barrett, and W.D. Davies)
 Essays on Law and Religion: The Berkeley and Oxford Symposia in Honour of David Daube, 1993 (ed. Calum M. Carmichael)

Memorial volumes
 Law for All Times: Essays in Memory of David Daube, 2004.  (ed. Ernest Metzger)
 David Daube: A Centenary Celebration, 2010.  (ed. Ernest Metzger)

Notes

References

1909 births
1999 deaths
Writers from Freiburg im Breisgau
20th-century German Jews
Fellows of the British Academy
Jewish emigrants from Nazi Germany to the United Kingdom
Fellows of Gonville and Caius College, Cambridge
Academics of the University of Aberdeen
Regius Professors of Civil Law (University of Oxford)
German legal scholars
Fellows of All Souls College, Oxford
Presidents of the Classical Association